Roger Craig Smith (born August 11, 1975) is an American voice actor. He is well known for his video game voice roles as Chris Redfield in the Resident Evil series (2009–2017), Ezio Auditore da Firenze in the Assassin's Creed series (2009–2011), Sonic the Hedgehog in the series of the same name (2010–present), and Captain America in several Marvel projects.

Early life 
Smith was born on August 11, 1975 in Orange County, California. He attended Chapman University where he briefly performed stand-up comedy for five years. He graduated from the Chapman University's Dodge College of Film and Media Arts in 2003 with a degree in screenwriting. Upon graduating from college, he left stand-up comedy and begin pursuing voice acting full time in 2004; his stand-up routines also helped him in his approach to his voice acting career.

Career 

Smith's voice work has been called upon by companies such as Disney/Disney Television Animation, Cartoon Network, Xbox Game Studios, Sony, Wal-Mart, Baskin-Robbins, E! and TLC.

Since 2007, he has been the narrator for Say Yes to the Dress.

Smith became the third official voice of the Sega character Sonic the Hedgehog in the video game series of the same name beginning in 2010, replacing Jason Griffith. Outside of the video games, he reprised the role as the character again in the animated spinoff television series Sonic Boom, as well as in cameo roles in Wreck-It Ralph and its sequel Ralph Breaks the Internet. In January 2021, he revealed on his Twitter account that he would no longer be voicing the character, which was later redacted in May 2021, when he announced his return to the franchise.

Smith also voices Ezio Auditore da Firenze from the Assassin's Creed series, Chris Redfield in the Resident Evil series, Hawkodile and Richard from Unikitty!, Captain America / Steve Rogers in several Marvel projects, Deidara in Naruto: Shippuden, Thomas and various other characters in Regular Show, Shinji Hirako in Bleach, Martin Reest in Monster, and Batman / Bruce Wayne in Batman: Arkham Origins, Batman Ninja, and Superman: Red Son. He also voiced Kyle Crane in Dying Light and Mirage in Apex Legends.

Filmography

Film

Television

Animation

Anime

Video games

Web

Theme parks

References

External links

 
 
 

Living people
American male video game actors
American male voice actors
21st-century American male actors
Chapman University alumni
American stand-up comedians
American male comedians
Sega people
20th-century American comedians
20th-century American male actors
21st-century American comedians
Year of birth missing (living people)